Renfrew Fulbar Street railway station served the town of Renfrew, Renfrewshire, Scotland from 1837 to 1967 on the Paisley and Renfrew Railway.

History 
The first station opened on 3 April 1837 on the Paisley and Renfrew Railway. A permanent station was opened on 1 December 1865. The station closed to both passengers and goods traffic on 5 June 1967. The station building has been converted to two cottages.

References

External links 

Disused railway stations in Renfrewshire
Former Glasgow and South Western Railway stations
Railway stations in Great Britain opened in 1837
Railway stations in Great Britain closed in 1967
1837 establishments in Scotland
1967 disestablishments in Scotland
Renfrew